"Showtime" is the eleventh episode of the seventh and final season of the television series Buffy the Vampire Slayer.

Plot
A young woman gets off a bus at a bus station at night and heads to a payphone to find the number for Buffy Summers. Before she can find the number, she is cornered by some of the Bringers, but before they can attack, Buffy arrives and rescues the young Potential Slayer. Once Buffy disposes of the Bringers, Buffy welcomes the frightened woman, Rona, to Sunnydale. At the Summers house, Willow struggles to sleep on the floor of her room while Kennedy talks about her luxurious childhood, prompts Willow to do some magic and repeatedly attempts to get Willow to join her on the bed, making Willow uncomfortable.

Downstairs, Molly tells several new Slayers-in-Training about the recently killed Anabelle. Buffy arrives with Rona and the gang is updated on the recent activities and findings. The worried gang lacks answers to most of their current problems like destroying the Turok-Han and rescuing Spike from the First Evil. Giles suggests they seek answers from an oracle-like creature known as Beljoxa's Eye. Down in the cave where he is kept prisoner, Spike fantasizes about escaping his torture and being rescued by Buffy, only to return to reality where the First in Buffy's form is waiting for him.

Giles and Anya go together to meet with a demon, named Torg, about Beljoxa's Eye. After some careful persuasion, Torg opens up a dimensional portal for the both of them to pass through. On the other side, they find themselves in a dark, windy dimension and soon come face-to-face with a caged mass of eyes, the Beljoxa's Eye, which tells them that the First Evil cannot be destroyed and that its mission exists now because of a disruption in the Slayer's line, which was in fact, caused by the Slayer. Anya and Giles return to their home dimension and Giles explains that the disturbance in the Slayer line was Buffy's revival from death. Anya realizes that the First would not be targeting them had they never resurrected Buffy.

As Andrew is freed from his bonds in return for his co-operation, Willow gets a call from a member of the Coven in England, and informs Buffy about another Potential Slayer in town and Buffy rushes off with Xander to pick the girl up before the Bringers do. The Slayers-in-Training work out in the basement of Buffy's house and thanks to some depressing comments from Eve, they talk about the seemingly insurmountable challenge they are facing and being called as a Slayer. Buffy and Xander knock at the room where the latest Potential Slayer is staying. When no one answers, Buffy kicks the door in and they find a dead blond girl lying on the ground. Upon closer inspection, they find that the girl is Eve and she has been dead for days. Realizing that the Eve who is with them is actually the First, Buffy and Xander return to the house and go down to the basement, where they tell "Eve" to get away from the others. The First finally reveals itself and with some thanks for all the information over the past few days and threatening comments about the future, then disappears. The gang, all worried after the frightening invasion by the First, talk about what they are going to do. Buffy tries to keep the Potentials calm, but they continue to worry about whether they are prepared to handle anything that lies before them. Buffy and Willow exchange glances and then both leave the dining room, followed by a confused Xander while the others continue to panic.

Back in the cave, the First approaches the Turok-Han as Eve and sends him out to kill everyone except "her". A crowd of Bringers forms outside Buffy's house that night, but do nothing but keep the Potentials from leaving. Buffy disperses weapons to the gang as they all wait for the expected attack of the Turok-Han. Willow practices some simple magic to see if the First would go after her again. Kennedy interrupts and is intrigued by Willow's skills and her past struggles with it. Willow warns her that the evil magic she has been exposed to in the past is not something Kennedy wants to see.

The Turok-Han charges at the house and breaks the front door down. Willow puts up a barrier that keeps the vampire at bay, but it is almost too much for Willow and Buffy instructs everyone to run out the back. The gang encounters Bringers in the backyard, but they are destroyed and the gang runs off as the Turok-Han finally breaks through Willow's magical barrier. The gang runs down the street together and then Buffy tells them to break up. Willow and Xander lead the Potentials as well as Dawn and Andrew to a safe location while Buffy turns and attacks the Turok-Han. After a brief struggle, Buffy runs and tries to get the vampire to follow her.

Xander leads the way through a construction site, which the Potentials find to be an extremely exposed and unsafe location for them hiding at. The Turok-Han appears, proving that it decided to go after the easier Potentials instead of Buffy. Kennedy prepares to attack the vampire, but then bright lights flood the site and Buffy appears as the Potential Slayers move back to watch from a distance. Buffy tells the ubervamp that he will help her set an example for the other girls and begins a fight. A vicious battle ensues, but the ubervamp again proves to be stronger. As Dawn watches, she realizes aloud that Willow and Buffy planned everything as a teaching tool. A quick flashback to the panic-filled discussion at the house earlier shows that at the moment that Buffy, Willow and Xander left the others, the three were communicating telepathically about a plan to destroy the ubervamp and boost morale of the others at the same time.

The Potentials begin to worry as Buffy ends up on the losing end of the fight, but Willow tells them to wait. Just in time, Buffy turns things around and strikes the ubervamp with a few harmful blows. Buffy finally grabs a wire to wrap around the vampire's neck and pulls until she beheads the creature, turning it to dust. The Turok-Han dusted, the bruised and blood-splattered Buffy ends her teachings for the day and leads the newly confident Slayers-in-Training back home. In the cave, Spike tries to tell off Buffy as she stands before him with a knife in hand, thinking that she is the First. Buffy cuts away his bonds as Spike wraps his arm around her, realizing it is actually the real Buffy. She helps the sobbing vampire out of the cave.

References

External links

2003 American television episodes
Buffy the Vampire Slayer (season 7) episodes
Television episodes written by David Fury